This is a list of townships in Iowa by county based on United States Geological Survey and U.S. Census data.

See: List of Iowa townships, List of counties in Iowa, List of cities in Iowa.

 

Adair County
 Eureka
 Grand River
 Greenfield
 Grove
 Harrison
 Jackson
 Jefferson
 Lee
 Lincoln
 Orient
 Prussia
 Richland
 Summerset
 Summit
 Union
 Walnut
 Washington

Adams County
 Carl
 Colony
 Douglas
 Grant
 Jasper
 Lincoln
 Mercer
 Nodaway
 Prescott
 Quincy
 Union
 Washington

Allamakee County
 Center
 Fairview
 Franklin
 French Creek
 Hanover
 Iowa
 Jefferson
 Lafayette
 Lansing
 Linton
 Ludlow
 Makee
 Paint Creek
 Post
 Taylor
 Union City
 Union Prairie
 Waterloo

Appanoose County
 Bellair
 Caldwell
 Chariton
 Douglas
 Franklin
 Independence
 Johns
 Lincoln
 Pleasant
 Sharon
 Taylor
 Udell
 Union
 Vermillion
 Walnut
 Washington
 Wells

Audubon County
 Audubon
 Cameron
 Douglas
 Exira
 Greeley
 Hamlin
 Leroy
 Lincoln
 Melville
 Oakfield
 Sharon
 Viola

Benton County
 Benton
 Big Grove
 Bruce
 Canton
 Cedar
 Eden
 Eldorado
 Florence
 Fremont
 Harrison
 Homer
 Iowa
 Jackson
 Kane
 Leroy
 Monroe
 Polk
 St. Clair
 Taylor
 Union

Black Hawk County
 Barclay
 Bennington
 Big Creek
 Black Hawk
 Cedar
 Cedar Falls
 Eagle
 East Waterloo
 Fox
 Lester
 Lincoln
 Mount Vernon
 Orange
 Poyner
 Spring Creek
 Union
 Washington

Boone County
 Amaqua
 Beaver
 Cass
 Colfax
 Des Moines
 Dodge
 Douglas
 Garden
 Grant
 Harrison
 Jackson
 Marcy
 Peoples
 Pilot Mound
 Union
 Worth
 Yell

Bremer County
 Dayton
 Douglas
 Franklin
 Frederika
 Fremont
 Jackson
 Jefferson
 Lafayette
 Le Roy
 Maxfield
 Polk
 Sumner No. 2
 Warren
 Washington

Buchanan County
 Buffalo
 Byron
 Cono
 Fairbank
 Fremont
 Hazleton
 Homer
 Jefferson
 Liberty
 Madison
 Middlefield
 Newton
 Perry
 Sumner
 Washington
 Westburg

Buena Vista County
 Barnes
 Brooke
 Coon
 Elk
 Fairfield
 Grant
 Hayes
 Lee
 Lincoln
 Maple Valley
 Newell
 Nokomis
 Poland
 Providence
 Scott
 Washington

Butler County
 Albion
 Beaver
 Bennezette
 Butler
 Coldwater
 Dayton
 Fremont
 Jackson
 Jefferson
 Madison
 Monroe
 Pittsford
 Ripley
 Shell Rock
 Washington
 West Point

Calhoun County
 Butler
 Calhoun
 Cedar
 Center
 Elm Grove
 Garfield
 Greenfield
 Jackson
 Lake City
 Lake Creek
 Lincoln
 Logan
 Reading
 Sherman
 Twin Lakes
 Union
 Williams

Carroll County
 Arcadia
 Eden
 Ewoldt
 Glidden
 Grant
 Jasper
 Kniest
 Maple River
 Newton
 Pleasant Valley
 Richland
 Roselle
 Sheridan
 Union
 Washington
 Wheatland

Cass County
 Bear Grove
 Benton
 Brighton
 Cass
 Edna
 Franklin
 Grant
 Grove
 Lincoln
 Massena
 Noble
 Pleasant
 Pymosa
 Union
 Victoria
 Washington

Cedar County
 Cass
 Center
 Dayton
 Fairfield
 Farmington
 Fremont
 Gower
 Inland
 Iowa
 Linn
 Massillon
 Pioneer
 Red Oak
 Rochester
 Springdale
 Springfield
 Sugar Creek

Cerro Gordo County
 Bath
 Clear Lake
 Dougherty
 Falls
 Geneseo
 Grant
 Grimes
 Lake
 Lime Creek
 Lincoln
 Mason
 Mount Vernon
 Owen
 Pleasant Valley
 Portland
 Union

Cherokee County
 Afton
 Amherst
 Cedar
 Cherokee
 Diamond
 Grand Meadow
 Liberty
 Marcus
 Pilot
 Pitcher
 Rock
 Sheridan
 Silver
 Spring
 Tilden
 Willow

Chickasaw County
 Bradford
 Chickasaw
 Dayton
 Deerfield
 Dresden
 Fredericksburg
 Jacksonville
 New Hampton
 Richland
 Stapleton
 Utica
 Washington

Clarke County
 Doyle
 Franklin
 Fremont
 Green Bay
 Jackson
 Knox
 Liberty
 Madison
 Osceola
 Troy
 Ward
 Washington

Clay County
 Clay
 Douglas
 Freeman
 Garfield
 Gillett Grove
 Herdland
 Lake
 Lincoln
 Logan
 Lone Tree
 Meadow
 Peterson
 Riverton
 Sioux
 Summit
 Waterford

Clayton County
 Boardman
 Buena Vista
 Cass
 Clayton
 Cox Creek
 Elk
 Farmersburg
 Garnavillo
 Giard
 Grand Meadow
 Highland
 Jefferson
 Lodomillo
 Mallory
 Marion
 Mendon
 Millville
 Monona
 Read
 Sperry
 Volga
 Wagner

Clinton County
 Bloomfield
 Brookfield
 Camanche
 Center
 De Witt
 Deep Creek
 Eden
 Elk River
 Grant
 Hampshire
 Liberty
 Olive
 Orange
 Sharon
 Spring Rock
 Washington
 Waterford
 Welton

Crawford County
 Boyer
 Charter Oak
 Denison
 East Boyer
 Goodrich
 Hanover
 Hayes
 Iowa
 Jackson
 Milford
 Morgan
 Nishnabotny
 Otter Creek
 Paradise
 Soldier
 Stockholm
 Union
 Washington
 West Side
 Willow

Dallas County
 Adams
 Adel
 Beaver
 Boone
 Colfax
 Dallas
 Des Moines
 Grant
 Lincoln
 Linn
 Spring Valley
 Sugar Grove
 Union
 Van Meter
 Walnut
 Washington

Davis County
 Cleveland
 Drakesville
 Fabius
 Fox River
 Grove
 Lick Creek
 Marion
 Perry
 Prairie
 Roscoe
 Salt Creek
 Soap Creek
 Union
 West Grove
 Wyacondah

Decatur County
 Bloomington
 Burrell
 Center
 Decatur
 Eden
 Fayette
 Franklin
 Garden Grove
 Grand River
 Hamilton
 High Point
 Long Creek
 Morgan
 New Buda
 Richland
 Woodland

Delaware County
 Adams
 Bremen
 Coffins Grove
 Colony
 Delaware
 Delhi
 Elk
 Hazel Green
 Honey Creek
 Milo
 North Fork
 Oneida
 Prairie
 Richland
 South Fork
 Union

Des Moines County
 Benton
 Burlington
 Concordia
 Danville
 Flint River
 Franklin
 Huron
 Jackson
 Pleasant Grove
 Tama
 Union
 Washington
 Yellow Springs

Dickinson County
 Center Grove
 Diamond Lake
 Excelsior
 Lakeville
 Lloyd
 Milford
 Okoboji
 Richland
 Silver Lake
 Spirit Lake
 Superior
 Westport

Dubuque County
 Cascade
 Center
 Concord
 Dodge
 Dubuque
 Iowa
 Jefferson
 Liberty
 Mosalem
 New Wine
 Peru
 Prairie Creek
 Table Mound
 Taylor
 Vernon
 Washington
 Whitewater

Emmet County
 Armstrong Grove
 Center
 Denmark
 Ellsworth
 Emmet
 Estherville
 High Lake
 Iowa Lake
 Jack Creek
 Lincoln
 Swan Lake
 Twelve Mile Lake

Fayette County
 Auburn
 Banks
 Bethel
 Center
 Clermont
 Dover
 Eden
 Fairfield
 Fremont
 Harlan
 Illyria
 Jefferson
 Oran
 Pleasant Valley
 Putnam
 Scott
 Smithfield
 Union
 Westfield
 Windsor

Floyd County
 Cedar
 Floyd
 Niles
 Pleasant Grove
 Riverton
 Rock Grove
 Rockford
 Rudd
 Saint Charles
 Scott
 Ulster
 Union

Franklin County
 Geneva
 Grant
 Hamilton
 Ingham
 Lee
 Marion
 Morgan
 Mott
 Oakland
 Osceola
 Reeve
 Richland
 Ross
 Scott
 West Fork
 Wisner

Fremont County
 Benton
 Fisher
 Green
 Locust Grove
 Madison
 Monroe
 Prairie
 Riverside
 Riverton
 Scott
 Sidney
 Walnut
 Washington

Greene County
 Bristol
 Cedar
 Dawson
 Franklin
 Grant
 Greenbrier
 Hardin
 Highland
 Jackson
 Junction
 Kendrick
 Paton
 Scranton
 Washington
 Willow

Grundy County
 Beaver
 Black Hawk
 Clay
 Colfax
 Fairfield
 Felix
 German
 Grant
 Lincoln
 Melrose
 Palermo
 Pleasant Valley
 Shiloh
 Washington

Guthrie County
 Baker
 Bear Grove
 Beaver
 Cass
 Dodge
 Grant
 Highland
 Jackson
 Orange
 Penn
 Richland
 Seely
 Stuart
 Thompson
 Union
 Valley
 Victory

Hamilton County
 Blairsburg
 Cass
 Clear Lake
 Ellsworth
 Freedom
 Fremont
 Hamilton
 Independence
 Liberty
 Lincoln
 Lyon
 Marion
 Rose Grove
 Scott
 Webster
 Webster City
 Williams

Hancock County
 Amsterdam
 Avery
 Bingham
 Boone
 Britt
 Concord
 Crystal
 Ell
 Ellington
 Erin
 Garfield
 Liberty
 Madison
 Magor
 Orthel
 Twin Lake

Hardin County
 Alden
 Buckeye
 Clay
 Concord
 Eldora
 Ellis
 Etna
 Grant
 Hardin
 Jackson
 Pleasant
 Providence
 Sherman
 Tipton
 Union

Harrison County
 Allen
 Boyer
 Calhoun
 Cass
 Cincinnati
 Clay
 Douglas
 Harrison
 Jackson
 Jefferson
 La Grange
 Lincoln
 Little Sioux
 Magnolia
 Morgan
 Raglan
 St. Johns
 Taylor
 Union
 Washington

Henry County
 Baltimore
 Canaan
 Center
 Jackson
 Jefferson
 Marion
 New London
 Salem
 Scott
 Tippecanoe
 Trenton
 Wayne

Howard County
 Afton
 Albion
 Chester
 Forest City
 Howard
 Howard Center
 Jamestown
 New Oregon
 Oak Dale
 Paris
 Saratoga
 Vernon Springs

Humboldt County
 Avery
 Beaver
 Corinth
 Dakota City
 Delana
 Grove
 Humboldt
 Lake
 Norway
 Rutland
 Vernon
 Wacousta
 Weaver

Ida County
 Battle
 Blaine
 Corwin
 Douglas
 Galva
 Garfield
 Grant
 Griggs
 Hayes
 Logan
 Maple
 Silver Creek

Iowa County
 Dayton
 English
 Fillmore
 Greene
 Hartford
 Hilton
 Honey Creek
 Iowa
 Lenox
 Lincoln
 Marengo
 Pilot
 Sumner
 Troy
 Washington
 York

Jackson County
 Bellevue
 Brandon
 Butler
 Fairfield
 Farmers Creek
 Iowa
 Jackson
 Maquoketa
 Monmouth
 Otter Creek
 Perry
 Prairie Springs
 Richland
 South Fork
 Tete Des Morts
 Union
 Van Buren
 Washington

Jasper County
 Buena Vista
 Clear Creek
 Des Moines
 Elk Creek
 Fairview
 Hickory Grove
 Independence
 Kellogg
 Lynn Grove
 Malaka
 Mariposa
 Mound Prairie
 Newton
 Palo Alto
 Poweshiek
 Richland
 Rock Creek
 Sherman
 Washington

Jefferson County
 Black Hawk
 Buchanan
 Cedar
 Center
 Des Moines
 Liberty
 Lockridge
 Locust Grove
 Penn
 Polk
 Round Prairie
 Walnut

Johnson County
 Big Grove
 Cedar
 Clear Creek
 East Lucas
 Fremont
 Graham
 Hardin
 Iowa City
 Jefferson
 Liberty
 Lincoln
 Madison
 Monroe
 Newport
 Oxford
 Penn
 Pleasant Valley
 Scott
 Sharon
 Union
 Washington
 West Lucas

Jones County
 Cass
 Castle Grove
 Clay
 Fairview
 Greenfield
 Hale
 Jackson
 Lovell
 Madison
 Oxford
 Richland
 Rome
 Scotch Grove
 Washington
 Wayne
 Wyoming

Keokuk County
 Adams
 Benton
 Clear Creek
 East Lancaster
 English River
 Jackson
 Lafayette
 Liberty
 Plank
 Prairie
 Richland
 Sigourney
 Steady Run
 Van Buren
 Warren
 Washington
 West Lancaster

Kossuth County
 Buffalo
 Burt
 Cresco
 Eagle
 Fenton
 Garfield
 German
 Grant
 Greenwood
 Harrison
 Hebron
 Irvington
 Ledyard
 Lincoln
 Lotts Creek
 Lu Verne
 Plum Creek
 Portland
 Prairie
 Ramsey
 Riverdale
 Seneca
 Sherman
 Springfield
 Swea
 Union
 Wesley
 Whittemore

Lee County
 Cedar
 Charleston
 Denmark
 Des Moines
 Franklin
 Green Bay
 Harrison
 Jackson
 Jefferson
 Madison
 Marion
 Montrose
 Pleasant Ridge
 Van Buren
 Washington
 West Point

Linn County
 Bertram
 Boulder
 Brown
 Buffalo
 Clinton
 College
 Fairfax
 Fayette
 Franklin
 Grant
 Jackson
 Linn
 Maine
 Marion
 Monroe
 Otter Creek
 Putnam
 Spring Grove
 Washington

Louisa County
 Columbus City
 Concord
 Eliot
 Elm Grove
 Grandview
 Jefferson
 Marshall
 Morning Sun
 Oakland
 Port Louisa
 Union
 Wapello

Lucas County
 Benton
 Cedar
 English
 Jackson
 Liberty
 Lincoln
 Otter Creek
 Pleasant
 Union
 Warren
 Washington
 Whitebreast

Lyon County
 Allison
 Centennial
 Cleveland
 Dale
 Doon
 Elgin
 Garfield
 Grant
 Larchwood
 Liberal
 Logan
 Lyon
 Midland
 Richland
 Riverside
 Rock
 Sioux
 Wheeler

Madison County
 Crawford
 Douglas
 Grand River
 Jackson
 Jefferson
 Lee
 Lincoln
 Madison
 Monroe
 Ohio
 Penn
 Scott
 South
 Union
 Walnut
 Webster

Mahaska County
 Adams
 Black Oak
 Cedar
 East Des Moines
 Garfield
 Harrison
 Jefferson
 Lincoln
 Madison
 Monroe
 Pleasant Grove
 Prairie
 Richland
 Scott
 Spring Creek
 Union
 West Des Moines
 White Oak

Marion County
 Clay
 Dallas
 Franklin
 Indiana
 Knoxville
 Lake Prairie
 Liberty
 Pleasant Grove
 Red Rock
 Summit
 Union
 Washington

Marshall County
 Bangor
 Eden
 Greencastle
 Iowa
 Jefferson
 Le Grand
 Liberty
 Liscomb
 Logan
 Marietta
 Marion
 Marshall
 Minerva
 State Center
 Taylor
 Timber Creek
 Vienna
 Washington

Mills County
 Anderson
 Center
 Deer Creek
 Glenwood
 Indian Creek
 Ingraham
 Lyons
 Oak
 Plattville
 Rawles
 St. Marys
 Silver Creek
 White Cloud

Mitchell County
 Burr Oak
 Cedar
 Douglas
 East Lincoln
 Jenkins
 Liberty
 Mitchell
 Newburg
 Osage
 Otranto
 Rock
 St. Ansgar
 Stacyville
 Union
 Wayne
 West Lincoln

Monona County
 Ashton
 Belvidere
 Center
 Cooper
 Fairview
 Franklin
 Grant
 Jordan
 Kennebec
 Lake
 Lincoln
 Maple
 St. Clair
 Sherman
 Sioux
 Soldier
 Spring Valley
 West Fork
 Willow

Monroe County
 Bluff Creek
 Cedar
 Franklin
 Guilford
 Jackson
 Mantua
 Monroe
 Pleasant
 Troy
 Union
 Urbana
 Wayne

Montgomery County
 Douglas
 East
 Frankfort
 Garfield
 Grant
 Lincoln
 Pilot Grove
 Red Oak
 Scott
 Sherman
 Washington
 West

Muscatine County
 Bloomington
 Cedar
 Fruitland
 Fulton
 Goshen
 Lake
 Montpelier
 Moscow
 Muscatine
 Orono
 Pike
 Seventy-Six
 Sweetland
 Wapsinonoc
 Wilton

O'Brien County
 Baker
 Caledonia
 Carroll
 Center
 Dale
 Floyd
 Franklin
 Grant
 Hartley
 Highland
 Liberty
 Lincoln
 Omega
 Summit
 Union
 Waterman

Osceola County
 Allison
 Baker
 East Holman
 Fairview
 Gilman
 Goewey
 Harrison
 Horton
 Ocheyedan
 Viola
 West Holman
 Wilson

Page County
 Amity
 Buchanan
 Colfax
 Douglas
 East River
 Fremont
 Grant
 Harlan
 Lincoln
 Morton
 Nebraska
 Nodaway
 Pierce
 Tarkio
 Valley
 Washington

Palo Alto County
 Booth
 Ellington
 Emmetsburg
 Fairfield
 Fern Valley
 Freedom
 Great Oak
 Highland
 Independence
 Lost Island
 Nevada
 Rush Lake
 Silver Lake
 Vernon
 Walnut
 West Bend

Plymouth County
 America
 Elgin
 Elkhorn
 Fredonia
 Garfield
 Grant
 Hancock
 Henry
 Hungerford
 Johnson
 Liberty
 Lincoln
 Marion
 Meadow
 Perry
 Plymouth
 Portland
 Preston
 Remsen
 Sioux
 Stanton
 Union
 Washington
 Westfield

Pocahontas County
 Bellville
 Cedar
 Center
 Colfax
 Cummins
 Des Moines
 Dover
 Garfield
 Grant
 Lake
 Lincoln
 Lizard
 Marshall
 Powhatan
 Roosevelt
 Sherman
 Swan Lake

Polk County
 Allen
 Beaver
 Bloomfield
 Camp
 Clay
 Crocker
 Delaware
 Des Moines
 Douglas
 Elkhart
 Four Mile
 Franklin
 Jefferson
 Lee
 Lincoln
 Madison
 Saylor
 Union
 Walnut
 Washington
 Webster

Pottawattamie County
 Belknap
 Boomer
 Carson
 Center
 Crescent
 Garner
 Grove
 Hardin
 Hazel Dell
 James
 Kane
 Keg Creek
 Knox
 Lake
 Layton
 Lewis
 Lincoln
 Macedonia
 Minden
 Neola
 Norwalk
 Pleasant
 Rockford
 Silver Creek
 Valley
 Washington
 Waveland
 Wright
 York

Poweshiek County
 Bear Creek
 Chester
 Deep River
 Grant
 Jackson
 Jefferson
 Lincoln
 Madison
 Malcom
 Pleasant
 Scott
 Sheridan
 Sugar Creek
 Union
 Warren
 Washington

Ringgold County
 Athens
 Benton
 Clinton
 Grant
 Jefferson
 Liberty
 Lincoln
 Lotts Creek
 Middle Fork
 Monroe
 Poe
 Rice
 Riley
 Tingley
 Union
 Washington
 Waubonsie

Sac County
 Boyer Valley
 Cedar
 Clinton
 Cook
 Coon Valley
 Delaware
 Douglas
 Eden
 Eureka
 Jackson
 Levey
 Richland
 Sac
 Viola
 Wall Lake
 Wheeler

Scott County
 Allens Grove
 Blue Grass
 Buffalo
 Butler
 Cleona
 Davenport City
 Hickory Grove
 Le Claire
 Liberty
 Lincoln
 Pleasant Valley
 Princeton
 Sheridan
 Winfield

Shelby County
 Cass
 Center
 Clay
 Douglas
 Fairview
 Greeley
 Grove
 Jackson
 Jefferson
 Lincoln
 Monroe
 Polk
 Shelby
 Union
 Washington
 Westphalia

Sioux County
 Buncombe
 Capel
 Center
 Eagle
 East Orange
 Floyd
 Garfield
 Grant
 Holland
 Lincoln
 Logan
 Lynn
 Nassau
 Plato
 Reading
 Rock
 Settlers
 Sheridan
 Sherman
 Sioux
 Washington
 Welcome
 West Branch

Story County
 Collins
 Franklin
 Grant
 Howard
 Indian Creek
 Lafayette
 Lincoln
 Milford
 Nevada
 New Albany
 Palestine
 Richland
 Sherman
 Union
 Warren
 Washington

Tama County
 Buckingham
 Carlton
 Carroll
 Clark
 Columbia
 Crystal
 Geneseo
 Grant
 Highland
 Howard
 Indian Village
 Lincoln
 Oneida
 Otter Creek
 Perry
 Richland
 Salt Creek
 Spring Creek
 Tama
 Toledo
 York

Taylor County
 Bedford
 Benton
 Clayton
 Dallas
 Gay
 Grant
 Grove
 Holt
 Jackson
 Jefferson
 Marshall
 Mason
 Nodaway
 Platte
 Polk
 Ross
 Washington

Union County
 Dodge
 Douglas
 Grant
 Highland
 Jones
 Lincoln
 New Hope
 Platte
 Pleasant
 Sand Creek
 Spaulding
 Union

Van Buren County
 Bonaparte
 Cedar
 Chequest
 Des Moines
 Farmington
 Harrisburg
 Henry
 Jackson
 Lick Creek
 Union
 Van Buren
 Vernon
 Village
 Washington

Wapello County
 Adams
 Agency
 Cass
 Center
 Columbia
 Competine
 Dahlonega
 Green
 Highland
 Keokuk
 Pleasant
 Polk
 Richland
 Washington

Warren County
 Allen
 Belmont
 Greenfield
 Jackson
 Jefferson
 Liberty
 Lincoln
 Linn
 Otter
 Palmyra
 Richland
 Squaw
 Union
 Virginia
 White Breast
 White Oak

Washington County
 Brighton
 Cedar
 Clay
 Crawford
 Dutch Creek
 English River
 Franklin
 Highland
 Iowa
 Jackson
 Lime Creek
 Marion
 Oregon
 Seventy-Six
 Washington

Wayne County
 Benton
 Clay
 Clinton
 Corydon
 Grand River
 Howard
 Jackson
 Jefferson
 Monroe
 Richman
 South Fork
 Union
 Walnut
 Warren
 Washington
 Wright

Webster County
 Badger
 Burnside
 Clay
 Colfax
 Cooper
 Dayton
 Deer Creek
 Douglas
 Elkhorn
 Fulton
 Gowrie
 Hardin
 Jackson
 Johnson
 Lost Grove
 Newark
 Otho
 Pleasant Valley
 Roland
 Sumner
 Washington
 Webster
 Yell

Winnebago County
 Buffalo
 Center
 Eden
 Forest
 Grant
 King
 Lincoln
 Linden
 Logan
 Mount Valley
 Newton
 Norway

Winneshiek County
 Bloomfield
 Bluffton
 Burr Oak
 Calmar
 Canoe
 Decorah
 Frankville
 Fremont
 Glenwood
 Hesper
 Highland
 Jackson
 Lincoln
 Madison
 Military
 Orleans
 Pleasant
 Springfield
 Sumner
 Washington

Woodbury County
 Arlington
 Banner
 Concord
 Floyd
 Grange
 Grant
 Kedron
 Lakeport
 Liberty
 Liston
 Little Sioux
 Miller
 Morgan
 Moville
 Oto
 Rock
 Rutland
 Sioux City
 Sloan
 Union
 West Fork
 Willow
 Wolf Creek
 Woodbury

Worth County
 Barton
 Bristol
 Brookfield
 Danville
 Deer Creek
 Fertile
 Grove
 Hartland
 Kensett
 Lincoln
 Silver Lake
 Union

Wright County
 Belmond
 Blaine
 Boone
 Dayton
 Eagle Grove
 Grant
 Iowa
 Lake
 Liberty
 Lincoln
 Norway
 Pleasant
 Troy
 Vernon
 Wall Lake
 Woolstock

References
 U.S. Board on Geographic Names

Townships

Iowa By County